Megachile capitata is a species of bee in the family Megachilidae. It was described by Smith in 1853.

References

Capitata
Insects described in 1853